Susan James  (born 1951) is a British professor of philosophy at Birkbeck College London. She has previously taught at the University of Connecticut and the University of Cambridge. She is well known for her work on the history of seventeenth and eighteenth century philosophy.

Education and career 

Susan James received her BA, MA and Ph.D. degrees in Philosophy from New Hall (now Murray Edwards College), University of Cambridge. She was Assistant Professor in the Department of Philosophy at the University of Connecticut for two years before she returned to Cambridge, first as the Kathryn Jex Blake Research Fellow at Girton College and then as Lecturer in the Faculty of Philosophy. She joined Birkbeck College in 2000 as Anniversary Reader, and became Professor of Philosophy in 2002. She was Chair of the Faculty of Philosophy in Cambridge from 1997-9 and then of the Birkbeck Philosophy Department in 2003-6. She is married and has two children.

She has held a number of Research Fellowships: from the British Academy and Leverhulme Foundation in 1994-5; at the Humanities Research Centre and Research School of Social Science, Australian National University (1994); at the Hebrew University of Jerusalem (1998); at the Wissenschaftskolleg zu Berlin (2003–04); at the Centre for Human Values, Princeton University (2013–14); and at the Berkeley UC School of Law (2019).  She has also held a number of Visiting Professorships: she was the John Findlay Visiting Professor at the Department of Philosophy, Boston University in 2008; the Kohut Visiting Professor at the University of Chicago in 2017; and an Associate Member of the Department of Comparative Thought and Literature, Johns Hopkins University (2015–18).

She was President of the Aristotelian Society in 2015–16 and was elected a Fellow of the British Academy in 2019.

Philosophical work 

Susan James has published seven books and more than 50 journal articles, ranging over the history of seventeenth and eighteenth century philosophy, political and social philosophy, and feminist philosophy. Much of her research considers how early modern metaphysics, epistemology, psychology, political philosophy and ethics were thought to contribute to the overall project of living well.  Passion and Action: The Emotions in Seventeenth-Century Philosophy (1997) concentrates on the role of the passions in early modern conceptions of the good life. In her work on Margaret Cavendish, James explores Cavendish’s efforts to blend philosophical insight and fantasy into a productive form of self-understanding. Two books on Spinoza, Spinoza on Philosophy, Religion and Politics (2012) and Spinoza on learning to Live Together (2020) range over the religious, epistemological, political and ethical aspects of a philosophical way of life. Throughout her work, Susan James tries to bring the history of philosophy into conversation with its contemporary counterpart. Her historical studies aim to illuminate contemporary philosophical problems.

Bibliography

Books 

 Spinoza on Learning to Live Together (Oxford University Press, 2020).
 Spinoza on Philosophy, Religion and Politics: The "Theologico-Political Treatise", x + 348pp., Oxford University Press, 2012.  Paperback edition 2014; e-book at Oxford Philosophy Online.
 The Political Writings of Margaret Cavendish, edited with an Introduction and critical apparatus.  Cambridge Texts in the History of Political Thought, xxxix + 298pp. Cambridge University Press, 2003.
 Visible Women:  Essays in Legal Theory and Political Philosophy co-edited with Stephanie Palmer, vii + 195pp., Hart Publishing, 2002.
 Passion and Action: The Emotions in Early Modern Philosophy, viii + 318pp., Oxford: The Clarendon Press, 1997. Paperback edition 1999; e-book at Oxford Philosophy Online. Chinese translation, Commercial Press Beijing, 2017.
 Beyond Equality and Difference, co-edited with Gisela Bock, vii + 210pp., London: Routledge, 1999.
 The Content of Social Explanation, viii + 192pp., Cambridge University Press, 1984. Paperback edition 2009.

Journal articles and book chapters 

 ‘Sociability and the Boundaries between Animal Species’ in Yitzhak Melamed ed. The Blackwell Companion to Spinoza (Blackwell, forthcoming).
 ‘The Interdependence of Hope and Fear’ in Critical Exchange: ‘Spinoza: Thoughts on Hope in our Political Present’, Contemporary Political Theory, 2020. 
 ‘Emotional Responses to Fiction. A Spinozist Approach’ in Anthony O’Hear ed. Emotions, The Royal Institute of Philosophy Supplement 85 (Cambridge University Press, 2019). 
 ‘Spinoza’s Philosophical Religion’ in Don Garrett ed., The Cambridge Companion to Spinoza, revised edition (Cambridge University Press, forthcoming).
 ‘Politically Mediated Affects. Envy in Spinoza’s Tractatus Politicus in Yitzhak Melamed and Hasana Sharpe eds., A Critical Guide to Spinoza’s Tractatus Politicus (Cambridge University Press, 2018). 
 ‘Mixt natures which I call hermaphroditical: Margaret Cavendish on the Natures of Things’ in Emily Thomas ed., Early Modern Women on Metaphysics, Religion and Science, (Cambridge University Press, 2018).
 ‘A Virtuous Practice:  Descartes on Scientific Activity’ in Descartes and Cartesianism ed. Stephen Gaukroger and Catherine Wilson (Oxford University Press, 2017).
 ‘Metaphysics and Empowerment: Moore on the Place of Metaphysics in Spinoza’s Philosophy’ in The Evolution of Modern Metaphysics: Responses to A. W. Moore with his Replies, Philosophical Topics 43.1&2, 2017.
 ‘Why Should we Read Spinoza?’ in The History of Philosophy, Royal Institute of Philosophy Supplement 79, edited by Anthony O'Hear (Cambridge University Press, 2016).
 ‘Mary Wollstonecraft’s Conception of Rights’ in Sandrine Berges and Alan Coffee eds., The Social and Political Thought of Mary Wollstonecraft (Oxford University Press, 2016). 
 ‘Wanting to Understand: Spinoza on Fortitudo’ in Spinoza Research: To Be Continued, Uitgeverij Spinozahuis, 2016. 
 ‘Freedom and Nature:  A Spinozist Invitation’, Proceedings of the Aristotelian Society CXVI, 2015-16.
 ‘Права как выражение республиканской свободы. Спиноза о праве и силе’ (Transliterated: Prava kak vyrazhenie respublikasnkoi svobody. Spinoza o prave i sile) in Evgeny Roshchin ed., Sovremennaya Respublikanskaya Teoriya SvobodyEuropean University at St Petersburg Press, 2015.
 ‘Spinoza, The Body and the Good Life’ in Matthew J, Kisner ad Andrew Youpa eds., Essays on Spinoza’s Ethical Theory(Oxford University Press, 2014).
 ‘Fruitful Imagining’, British Journal of Aesthetics, 53.1 (2013). 
 ‘Spinoza on the Passionate Dimension of Philosophical Reasoning’ in Sabrina Ebbersmeyer ed., Emotional Minds. The Passions and the Limits of Pure Inquiry in Early Modern Philosophy (de Gruyter, 2012). 
 ‘When Does Truth Matter? Spinoza on the Relation between Theology and Philosophy’, European Journal of Philosophy’, vol. 20:1 (2012), 91-108.
 ‘Creating Rational Understanding: Spinoza as a Social Epistemologist’, Aristotelian Society Supplementary Volume, vol. 85:1 (2011), 181-199.
 ‘Narrative as the Means to Freedom’ in Yitzhak Y. Melamed and Michael A. Rosenthal eds., Spinoza’s ‘Theological-Political Treatise’ (Cambridge University Press, 2010).
 ‘Politics and the Progress of Sentiments’ in Randall E. Auxier and Lewis Edwin Hahn eds., The Philosophy of Richard Rorty, The Library of Living Philosophers vol. XXXII (Open Court, 2010).
 ‘Freedom, Slavery and the Passions’ in Olli Koistinen ed., The Cambridge Companion to Spinoza’s‘Ethics’ (Cambridge University Press, 2009).
 ‘Law and Sovereignty in Spinoza’s Politics’ in Moira Gatens ed., Feminist Interpretations of Spinoza (Pennsylvania State University Press, 2009).
 ‘Shakespeare and the Politics of Superstition’ in David Armitage, Conal Condren and Andrew Fitzmaurice eds., Shakespeare and Early Modern Political Thought (Cambridge University Press, 2009).
 ‘Democracy and the Good Life in Spinoza’s Philosophy’ in Charlie Huenemann ed., Interpreting Spinoza (Cambridge University Press, 2008).
 ‘The Role of Amicitia in Political Life’ in Gabor Boros, Herman De Dijn and Martin Moors eds., The Concept of Love in 17thand 18th Century Philosophy (Leuven University Press, 2007).
 ‘Repressed Knowledge and the Transmission of Affect’ in Alice Jardine, Shannon Lundeen and Kelly Oliver eds., Living Attention: on Teresa Brennan (State University of New York Press, 2007).
 ‘The Politics of Emotion: Liberalism and Cognitivism’, in Anthony O’Hear ed., Political Philosophy, Royal Institute of Philosophy Supplementary Volume (Cambridge University Press, 2006).
 ‘Spinoza on Superstition. Coming to Terms with Fear’, Mededelingen Vanwege het Spinozahuis 88, 2006.
 ‘The Passions and the Good Life’ in Donald Rutherford ed., The Cambridge Companion to Early Modern Philosophy (Cambridge University Press, 2006).
 ‘Realising Rights as Enforceable Claims’ in Global Responsibilities.  Who Must Deliver on Human Rights?  ed. Andrew Kuper (Routledge, 2005).
 ‘Furcht und Aberglaube.  Spinoza und die Politik der Affekte’, Westend. Neue Zeitschrift fur Sozialforschung, 1 (2005), 49-60.
 'Rights, Moral and Enforceable:  A Reply to Saladin, Meckled Garcia’, Proceedings of the Aristotelian Society 105:1 (2005).
 ‘The Role of Amicitia in Political Life’ in Gabor Boros, Martin Moors and Herman de Dijn eds., The Concept of Love in Modern Philosophy, Koninklidjke Vlaamse Academie Van Belgie voor Wetenschappen en Kunsten, May 2005.
 ‘Sympathy and Comparison: Two Principles of Human Nature’ in M. Frasca-Spada and P. J. E. Kail eds., Impressions of Hume(Oxford University Press, 2005).
 ‘Spinoza and Materialism’ in Stephen H. Daniel ed., Current Continental Theory and Modern Philosophy (Northwestern University Press, 2005).
 ‘Complicity and Slavery in The Second Sex’ in Emily Grosholz ed., The Legacy of Simone de Beauvoir (Oxford University Press, 2004).  Earlier version in Claudia Card ed. The Cambridge Companion to Simone de Beauvoir (Cambridge University Press, 2002).
 ‘Rights as Enforceable Claims’ in Proceedings of the Aristotelian Society, vol. 103.2 (2003), pp. 133-47. 
 ‘Feminisms’ in R. Bellamy and T. Ball eds., The Cambridge History of Twentieth-Century Political Thought (Cambridge University Press, 2003), ch. 23.
 ‘The Passions and Political Philosophy’ in Anthony Hatzimoysis ed. Philosophy and the Emotions (Cambridge University Press, 2003).
 ‘Freedom and the Imaginary’ in Susan James and Stephanie Palmer eds., Visible Women. Essays on Feminist Legal Theory and Political Philosophy (Hart  Publishing Ltd., 2002). 
 ‘The Emergence of the Cartesian Mind’ in T. Crane and S. Patterson eds., The History of the Mind-Body Problem (Routledge, 2000).
 ‘Feminism in Philosophy of Mind. The Question of Personal Identity’ in Miranda Fricker and Jennifer Hornsby eds., The Cambridge Companion to Feminism in Philosophy (Cambridge University Press, 2000).  Reprinted in Keya Maitra and Jennifer McWeeney eds., Feminist Philosophy of Mind (Oxford University Press, forthcoming).
 'Grandeur and the Mechanical Philosophy’ in J. Kraye and M. Stone eds., Humanism and Early Modern Philosophy (Routledge, 2000).
 ‘Feminism’ in Routledge Encyclopaedia of Philosophy ed. Edward Craig, Routledge, 2000. Updated version reprinted in The Shorter Routledge Encyclopaedia of Philosophy, 2005.
 ‘The Philosophical Innovations of Margaret Cavendish’, British Journal for the History of Philosophy, vol. 7:2 (1999), 220-244. Reprinted in Sara H. Mendelson ed., Ashgate Critical Essays on Women Writers in England 1550-1700, vol. 7: Margaret Cavendish (Ashgate, 2009).
 ‘Desires, Passions and the Explanation of Action’ in Stephen Gaukroger ed., The Soft Underbelly of Reason (Routledge, 1998).
 ‘Reason, Passion and the Good Life’ in Daniel Garber and Michael Ayers eds., The Cambridge History of Seventeenth-Century Philosophy (Cambridge University Press, 1998), vol. II.
 ‘The Passions in Metaphysics and the Philosophy of Action’ in Daniel Garber and Michael Ayers eds., The Cambridge History of Seventeenth-Century Philosophy (Cambridge University Press, 1998), vol. I.
 ‘Power and Difference: Spinoza's Conception of Freedom’, The Journal of Political Philosophy, 4:3 (1996), 207-28.
 ‘Spinoza the Stoic’ in Tom Sorell ed., The Rise of Modern Philosophy (Oxford University Press, 1993).
 ‘The Good Enough Citizen’ in Gisela Bock and Susan James eds., Beyond Equality and Difference (Routledge, 1992). Translated into Italian.
 ‘Althusserean Materialism in England’ in Ceri Crossley and Ian Small eds., Studies in Anglo-French Cultural Relations(Methuen, 1988).
 ‘Certain and Less Certain Knowledge’ in Proceedings of the Aristotelian Society 87 (1987), 227-42. Reprinted in Vere Chappell ed. Grotius to Gassendi.
 ‘Louis Althusser’ in Q. Skinner ed., The Return of Grand Theory in the Human Sciences (Cambridge University Press, 1990. Translated into Chinese, Greek, Japanese, Polish, Portuguese, Spanish and Turkish.
 ‘The Duty to Relieve Suffering’ Ethics 93:1 (1982), 4-21. Reprinted in Cass Sunstein ed., Feminism and Political Theory (Chicago University Press, 1990).

References

External links 

 Profile at Birkbeck College website
 Profile on Philpapers
 Encountering the Author: Susan James, Spinoza on Philosophy, Religion and Politics
 BBC Radio4 'In Our Time's Greatest Philosopher Vote' Susan James on Spinoza

Living people
British philosophers
Alumni of Murray Edwards College, Cambridge
Academics of Birkbeck, University of London
1951 births
Presidents of the Aristotelian Society
British historians of philosophy